Omar Mohamed Omar (1970 – 25 December 2008), also known as Anyeelo,  was a Somali basketball player and coach. He was coach of the Somali national team from 2007 until his death. A member and coach of the Somalia national basketball team, Omar died in a car crash in England on 25 December 2008. He was the father to five young children and was married to his Dutch wife.

References

1970 births
2008 deaths
Somalian men's basketball players
Road incident deaths in England